Tania Lizardo (born October 10, 1989) is a Mexican actress best known for her work in television.

Biography
Born in León, Guanajuato, Tania Lizardo decided to pursue a career in acting at age 18. She dropped out of Universidad La Salle where she had been studying architecture, and moved to Mexico City where she graduated from the Centro de Educación Artística (CEA). She made her television debut in the "María, pescadera" chapter of the TV series Mujeres asesinas in 2009. In 2011, producer José Alberto Castro, whom she had met while studying at CEA, gave her a role on the telenovela La que no podía amar. She has gone on to appear in other telenovelas such as Ni contigo ni sin ti, Un refugio para el amor, Por siempre mi amor, and Lo imperdonable.

In 2012, Lizardo made her feature film debut in the romantic comedy .

Filmography

Telenovelas
 La que no podía amar (2011–2012) – María Paz "Maripaz" Hernández
 Ni contigo ni sin ti (2011)
 Un refugio para el amor (2012) – Melissa San Emeterio Fuentes-Gil
 Por siempre mi amor (2013–2014) – Marianela
 Lo imperdonable (2015) – Blanca "Blanquita" Arroyo Álvarez
 Simplemente María (2016) – Magdalena Flores Ríos
 El vuelo de la Victoria (2017) – Usumacinta "Cinta"
 La doble vida de Estela Carrillo (2017) – Ernestina "Nina" Tinoco
 Rubí (2020) - Cristina Pérez Ochoa
 La mexicana y el güero (2020-2021) - Zulema Gutiérrez
 Contigo sí (2021-2022) - Luz

TV series
 Mujeres asesinas (2009) – "María, pescadora"
 Difícil Decisión  (2011) – Claudia
 Como dice el dicho (2011–2012)
  (2013)
 En Medio De La Lluvia (2014) – Yolita
 La rosa de Guadalupe (2008–2014)'

Films
  (2012)

Awards and recognition

References

External links
 
 

1989 births
21st-century Mexican actresses
Living people
Mexican telenovela actresses
People from León, Guanajuato